Senator Rodney may refer to:

Members of the United States Senate
Caesar Augustus Rodney (1772–1824), U.S. Senator from Delaware from 1822 to 1823, also serving in the Delaware State Senate
Daniel Rodney (1764–1846), U.S. Senator from Delaware from 1826 to 1827

United States state senate members
Caesar Rodney (1728–1784), Delaware State Senate
Caleb Rodney (1767–1840), Delaware State Senate